Living DNA is a UK-based company that specialises in DNA testing and analysis whose head office is in the UK with facilities in the USA and Denmark. The service is to provide deep ancestry details from all around the world, using a unique process of analysis and using linked DNA. It is one of the major DNA testing services in the world.  The company conducts three types of DNA analyses: autosomal, Y-chromosome and mitochrondrial. However, while the DNA test results provide information about the origins of a person, genealogy, i.e. finding relatives in historic time, is not yet part of the company's portfolio.

History and partnership 
In 2016, Living DNA was co-founded by Tricia Nicholson and husband-and-wife team, David Nicholson and Hannah Morden-Nicholson, in Frome, Somerset, England. The company began after extensive research and work along with a team of around 100 genealogists around the world. In 1999 Nicholson founded another company, DNA Worldwide, which he has been running since.

In July 2018, Living DNA announced and signed a partnership agreement with Findmypast, also a British genealogy company. By working together, their mission is to provide an extensive and detailed family roots and history.

In 2019, Living DNA was reported to provide, for each DNA sample tested, recent (less than 80,00 years) ethnic breakdown for 80 regions in the world with the UK broken down in to 21 regions.  They also provided insight into female and paternal (for males) heritage going back about 200,000 years showing migration patterns out of Africa.

DNA privacy concerns 
Research published in the scientific journal eLife by geneticist Michael Edge from the University of California uncovered security concerns with customers DNA data held online by the smaller genealogy companies, including Living DNA. It was found that hackers using creative means could easily exploit these upload-based services. Biostatistician Sharon Browning from the University of Washington said that if consumers "care about their DNA's privacy, then they shouldn't upload [their DNA] to these databases."

Critics and reviews 
Living DNA has gotten a positive review from PCWorld. Tech Radar commented that "..the vagueness of some of its results combined with its relatively high price mean it doesn’t stand out from the crowd."

As at April 2022, ratings and reviews from the general public on the customer reviews website Trustpilot gave the company an average of 3.7 out of 5 stars.

After getting DNA tests results from three different companies to know if his "dad's family came from Russia", David Gewirtz says, "the results I got back from Ancestry and 23andMe were shocking and upsetting would be an understatement." While "the results from Living DNA were substantially different and led to some fascinating insights that were actually really cool, rather than painful."

Controversy surrounding key people
Director Hannah Morden-Nicholson, stepped down from the Frome Chamber of Commerce committee in early 2019 after being associated with a locally established "cult" Universal Medicine. This followed on from a BBC investigation into the "socially harmful" group. Co-director David Nicholson is also dedicated to the sect and its leader’s teachings, and ex-director and co-founder Tricia Nicholson declares a 'lifelong family friendship' with the sect's leader.

References

External links 

Company listing at the International Society for Genetic Genealogy Wiki
Ancestry DNA Testing Reviews for LivingDNA

British genealogy websites
Companies established in 2003
Companies based in Somerset
Genetic genealogy companies
Online companies of the United Kingdom
Applied genetics
Biotechnology companies of the United Kingdom
Biotechnology companies established in 2016
Biological databases
Privately held companies of England